The Congregation of the Sisters of St. Mary of Namur is a Roman Catholic religious order established in Namur, Belgium.

History 
The Congregation of the Sisters of St. Mary of Namur was established in Namur, Belgium on November 11, 1819, by Father Nicholas Minsart with the help of Josephine Sana and Elizabeth Berger. They started their congregation by giving sewing classes to the young women. Soon the congregation started spreading. The School St Mary's Catholic School, Bishop's Stortford was founded by the Sisters of Namur.

In United States 
The Sisters of St. Mary reached United States in 1863, in order to serve American Indians but due to the Civil War were not able to carry on their work but they managed to establish a school in New York. The Western Province of the Sisters of St. Mary was established in 1921. Today sisters are spread throughout the world and serving poor and needy; the main focus of the Sisters is on education.

Worldwide 
The congregation have mission houses in Africa and Brazil also

References 

Roman Catholic religious sisters and nuns by order
Catholic religious institutes established in the 19th century